Baron Bayning, of Foxley in the County of Berkshire, was a title in the Peerage of Great Britain.

It was created in 1797 for the politician Charles Townshend. He was the son of William Townshend, third son of Charles Townshend, 2nd Viscount Townshend (from whom the Marquesses Townshend descend) and the cousin of Thomas Townshend, 1st Viscount Sydney. Townshend descended through his mother from Anne Murray, Viscountess Bayning, and Paul Bayning, 1st Viscount Bayning, hence his choice of title. He was succeeded by his eldest son, the second Baron. He represented Truro in Parliament. In 1821 he assumed by Royal licence the surname of Powlett in lieu of Townshend. He died unmarried and was succeeded by his younger brother, the third Baron. He died without surviving male issue and the barony became extinct on his death in 1866.

Barons Bayning (1797)
Charles Townshend, 1st Baron Bayning (1728–1810)
Charles Frederick Powlett, 2nd Baron Bayning (1785–1823)
Henry William-Powlett, 3rd Baron Bayning (1797–1866)
Charles William Powlett (1844–1864)

See also
Marquess Townshend
Viscount Sydney
Viscountess Bayning

References

Extinct baronies in the Peerage of Great Britain
Baron Bayning
Noble titles created in 1797